Basavarajeshwari Jahagirdar was an Indian politician and 3 time Member of Parliament (MP), represented the Bellary Lok Sabha constituency in Lok Sabha, lower house of the Indian Parliament. She also served as Minister of State for Women and Child Development of India, from 1991 to 1996.

Early life and background 
Basava Rajeswari was born in 1928 at Raidurga, Anantapur District (Andhra Pradesh). She completed her education at Government Girls High School in Bellary (Karnataka).

Personal life 
Basava Rajeswari married Shri Sarana Basavaraj on 22 May 1948 and the couple has four sons and four daughters.

Positions held 

 Member of All India Congress Committee (AICC) for two terms.
 Secretary of District Congress Committee, Raichur.

Political career
Ms. Basavarajeshwari, whose political career lasted 40 years, was the Union Minister of State for Women and Child Development in the P.V. Narasimha Rao Ministry. She also served as a Deputy Minister between 1962 and 1967 and was a member of the Karnataka Legislative Council for one term.

She won the Bellary Lok Sabha seat three times in a row. She began her career as a Member of the Legislative Assembly in 1957 from Lingasugur in Raichur district, and was re-elected for the second term when she held the post of Deputy Minister for five years. She was later elected as the Member of the Legislative Council (1977–84).

She won the Bellary Lok Sabha seat thrice in 1984, 1989 and 1991 and was inducted into the P.V. Narasimha Rao MinistryP.V. Narasimha Rao Ministry. As the Union Minister, Ms. Basavarajeshwari represented the country at the World Women's Conference held at Beijing in China.

She kept a low profile after she was denied the Congress ticket to contest in the Lok Sabha elections from Bellary in 1996 and floated a trust, for which she was the chairperson. It started several educational institutions, including an engineering college, schools, a polytechnic and an ITI.

In 2004, Ms. Basavarajeshwari joined the Bharatiya Janata Party and campaigned for the party not only in Bellary but also in the neighbouring districts.

References

1920s births
2008 deaths
India MPs 1984–1989
India MPs 1989–1991
India MPs 1991–1996
Lok Sabha members from Karnataka
People from Bellary district
Bharatiya Janata Party politicians from Karnataka
Indian National Congress politicians from Karnataka
Mysore MLAs 1957–1962
Mysore MLAs 1962–1967
Mysore MLAs 1967–1972
Mysore MLAs 1972–1977
Members of the Mysore Legislature
Members of the Karnataka Legislative Council